Abdollahabad-e Bala (also Romanized as ‘Abdollāhābād-e Bālā; also known as ‘Abdollāhābād) is a village in Lasgerd Rural District, in the Central District of Sorkheh County, Semnan Province, Iran. According to the 2006 census, its population was 34, in 20 families.

References 

Populated places in Sorkheh County